P Tech may refer to:

P.Tech, Professional Technologist, Canadian and Malaysian professional title
P-TECH, Pathways in Technology Early College High School, New York City public high school 
Ptech,  American provider of business process modeling software